Kitti Kudor (born 22 January 1988 in Debrecen) is a retired Hungarian handballer. She retired from professional handball in 2018 and started to work as a coach at DVSC's U16 team, which plays in the 3rd division of the age category.

Achievements
EHF Cup:
Semifinalist: 2006

References

External links
 Kitti Kudor career statistics at Worldhandball

1988 births
Living people
Sportspeople from Debrecen
Hungarian female handball players
Békéscsabai Előre NKSE players